The 2022 North Carolina Tar Heels women's soccer team represented the University of North Carolina at Chapel Hill during the 2022 NCAA Division I women's soccer season. It was the 46th season of the university fielding a program. The Tar Heels were led by 46th year head coach Anson Dorrance and played their home games at Dorrance Field in Chapel Hill, North Carolina.

The team finished the season 20–5–1 and 8–2–0 in ACC play to finish in a tie for first place.  As the first seed in the ACC Tournament, they hosted rival Duke in the Semifinal after receiving a First Round bye and drew 0–0.  The Tar Heels won the ensuing penalty shoot-out 7–6 to advance to the final where they lost to Florida State.  They received an at-large bid to the 2022 NCAA Division I women's soccer tournament where they were the second seed in the Notre Dame Bracket.  They defeated  in the First Round, seven-seed  in the Second Round, and six-seed BYU in the Round of 16.  They then had to travel to Notre Dame to face one-seed Notre Dame.  The Tar Heels advanced with a 2–0 win to the College Cup, where they would face Florida State again.  The Tar Heels won the rematch of the ACC Tournament Final 3–2 and advanced to the national title game against .  North Carolina lost a tight match 3–2, with UCLA scoring goals in the 80th and 89th minutes to force overtime and scoring the game winner in the 107th minute.

Previous season 

The Tar Heels finished the season 12–3–3, 5–2–3 in ACC play to finish in a tie for sixth place.  Only six teams qualified for the ACC Tournament and the Tar Heels lost the tiebreaker to Wake Forest and did not qualify for the tournament.  This was the first time in program history that North Carolina missed out on the ACC Tournament.  They received an at-large bid to the 2021 NCAA Division I women's soccer tournament where they lost to South Carolina in the First Round.  Their First Round exit was the earliest exit of any NCAA Tournament they had participated in.

Departures

Incoming Transfers

Recruiting Class

Source:

Squad

Roster

Team management 

Source:

Schedule

Source:

|-
!colspan=6 style=""| Exhibition

|-
!colspan=6 style=""| Non-conference Regular season

|-
!colspan=6 style=""| ACC Regular Season

|-
!colspan=6 style=""| ACC Tournament

|-
!colspan=6 style=""| NCAA Tournament

Awards and honors

Rankings

2023 NWSL Draft

Source:

References 

North Carolina
North Carolina
2021
North Carolina women's soccer
North Carolina